Dennis Hayes may refer to:

 Dennis Hayes (businessman) (born 1950), founder of Hayes Microcomputer Products
 Dennis Hayes (musician), American bass guitarist
 Dennis Hayes (professor) (born 1950), professor of education 
 Dennis Courtland Hayes (born 1951), executive at the National Association for the Advancement of Colored People

See also
 Denis Hayes (born 1944), environmental advocate and proponent of solar power
 Denis A. Hayes (1860–1917), American labor union leader
 Dennis K. Hays (born 1953), United States Ambassador to Suriname